VAP-62 was a Heavy Photographic Squadron of the U.S. Navy. Originally established as Photographic Squadron Sixty-Two (VJ-62) on 10 April 1952, it was redesignated as Heavy Photographic Squadron (VAP-62) on 2 July 1956. The squadron was disestablished on 15 October 1969.

Operational history

1 September–19 December 1952: A squadron detachment was deployed to Dhahran Air Force Base in Saudi Arabia.
29 July 1960: During a landing aboard , the squadron’s commanding officer, Commander C. T. Frohne, and two other squadron crewmembers, were lost when the tailhook of their A3D-2P Skywarrior separated and the aircraft plunged off the deck into the sea.
October 1966: The squadron transferred a detachment of aircraft and personnel to VAP-61 to augment that squadron’s operations in Vietnam.
25 August 1967: A squadron RA-3B #144835 disappeared on a nighttime photo-reconnaissance mission, the 3 man crew were killed in action, body not recovered.

Home port assignments
The squadron was assigned to these home ports, effective on the dates shown:
 NAS Jacksonville - 10 April 1952
 NAAS Sanford - 20 October 1952
 NAS Norfolk - July 1955
 NAS Jacksonville - 15 August 1957

Aircraft assignment
The squadron first received the following aircraft on the dates shown:
PB4Y-1P/P4Y-1P Privateer - May 1952
AJ-2P Savage - September 1952
F7F-4N Tigercat - May 1953
A3D-1P/A3D-2P/RA-3B Skywarrior - 14 October 1957

See also
 Reconnaissance aircraft
 List of inactive United States Navy aircraft squadrons
 History of the United States Navy

References

External links

Wikipedia articles incorporating text from the Dictionary of American Naval Aviation Squadrons
Fleet air reconnaissance squadrons of the United States Navy